The Adamasta Rock is an uninhabited undersea rock in Hong Kong, in the centre of the busy Adamasta Channel between the Chi Ma Wan Peninsula of Lantau Island and Cheung Chau island, in Hong Kong. It falls within the Islands District.

The rock is submerged at high water and presents a significant shipping hazard due to its location in the middle of the Adamasta shipping channel. The Hong Kong Marine Department has installed a fixed beacon (isolated danger) on the rock and two cardinal buoys on either side to warn shipping.

On Sunday 8 May 2011, the river trader "Zhong Fu Fa Zhan" grounded on the rock.

Uninhabited islands of Hong Kong
Islands District
Islands of Hong Kong